Twentieth Century Theatre is a registered historic building in Cincinnati, Ohio, listed in the National Register on August 26, 1993. It is located at 3021 Madison Road. Built in 1941 as a deluxe neighborhood movie theater, today it functions as a mixed use venue for special events catering and concerts.

Notes 

National Register of Historic Places in Cincinnati
Theatres in Cincinnati
Theatres on the National Register of Historic Places in Ohio